Oxmoor may refer to:

 Oxmoor Center, shopping mall in Louisville, Kentucky
 Oxmoor Copse, Surrey
 Oxmoor Farm, estate in Louisville, Kentucky
 Oxmoor House, book publishing division of Southern Progress Corporation
 Oxmoor, Alabama, a populated place located within the city of Birmingham

References